Winstead Sheffield "Doodles" Weaver (May 11, 1911 – January 17, 1983) was an American character actor, comedian, and musician.

Born into a wealthy West Coast family, Weaver began his career in radio. In the late 1930s, he performed on Rudy Vallée's radio programs and Kraft Music Hall. He later joined Spike Jones' City Slickers. In 1957, Weaver hosted his own NBC variety show The Doodles Weaver Show. In addition to his radio work, he also recorded a number of comedy records, appeared in films and guest-starred on numerous television series from the 1950s through the 1970s. Weaver made his last onscreen appearance in 1981. Despondent over poor health, Weaver fatally shot himself in January 1983.

Early life
Born in Los Angeles, Weaver was one of four children born to Sylvester Laflin Weaver, a wealthy roofing contractor, and Nellie Mabel (Amabel) Dixon Weaver. His older brother was Pat Weaver, who served as the president of NBC in the 1950s. Weaver's niece is actress Sigourney Weaver. He was of English and Scottish ancestry with roots in New England. Weaver's mother gave him the nickname "Doodlebug" as a child because of his freckles and big ears.

He attended Los Angeles High School and Stanford University. At Stanford, Weaver was a contributor to the Stanford Chaparral humor magazine. He was also known to engage in numerous pranks and practical jokes and earned the nickname "The Mad Monk". He was reportedly suspended from Stanford in 1937 (the year he graduated) for pulling a prank on the train home from the Rose Bowl.

Career

Radio and recordings
On radio during the late 1930s and early 1940s, he was heard as an occasional guest on Rudy Vallée's program and on the Kraft Music Hall.

In 1946, Weaver signed on as a member of Spike Jones's City Slickers band. Weaver was heard on Jones's 1947–49 radio shows, where he introduced his comedic Professor Feetlebaum (which Weaver sometimes spelled as Feitlebaum), a character who spoke in Spoonerisms. Part of the Professor's shtick was mixing up words and sentences in various songs and recitations as if he were suffering from myopia and/or dyslexia. Weaver toured the country with the Spike Jones Music Depreciation Revue until 1951. The radio programs were often broadcast from cities where the Revue was staged.

One of Weaver's most popular recordings is the Spike Jones parody of Rossini's "William Tell Overture". Weaver gives a close impression of the gravel-voiced sports announcer Clem McCarthy in a satire of a horse race announcer who forgets whether he's covering a horse race or a boxing match ("It's Girdle in the stretch! Locomotive is on the rail! Apartment House is second with plenty of room! It's Cabbage by a head!"). The race features a nag named Beetlebaum, who begins at long odds, runs the race a distant last—and yet suddenly emerges as the winner. The oft-repeated "Beetlebaum" became so identified with the record that RCA reprinted the record label, adding "Beetlebaum" in parentheses after the song title. Jones and Weaver followed this hit with a 1949 parody of the Indianapolis 500 automobile race, again with Weaver as commentator, set to Ponchielli's "Dance of the Hours". The surprise winner? Beetlebaum. When an angry listener named Beetlebaum threatened a lawsuit, Weaver changed the name to Feitlebaum.

In 1966, Weaver recorded a novelty version of "Eleanor Rigby"—singing, mixing up the words, insulting, and interrupting, while playing the piano.

Writing
Weaver was a contributor to the early Mad, as described by Time'''s Richard Corliss:
Among the funny stuff: Doodles Weaver's strict copy editing of the Gettysburg Address, advising Lincoln to change "fourscore and seven" to eighty-seven ("Be specific"), noting that there are six "dedicates" ("Study your Roget"), wondering if "proposition" isn't misspelled and, finally exasperated, urging the writer to omit "of the people, by the people, for the people" as "superfluous."

Films and television
Weaver made his television debut on The Colgate Comedy Hour in 1951. He performed an Ajax cleanser commercial with a pig, and the audience reaction prompted the network to give him his own series. In 1951, The Doodles Weaver Show was NBC's summer replacement for Sid Caesar's Your Show of Shows; it was telecast from June to September with Weaver, his wife Lois, vocalist Marian Colby, and the comedy team of Dick Dana and Peanuts Mann. The show's premise involved Weaver dealing with an assignment to stage a no-budget television series using only the discarded costumes, sets and props left behind by more popular network television shows away for the summer. The series ended in July 1951.

Weaver went on to guest star on numerous television shows including The Spike Jones Show, The Donna Reed Show, Dennis the Menace, and The Tab Hunter Show. He also hosted several children's television series. In 1965, he starred in A Day With Doodles, a series of six-minute shorts sold as alternative fare to cartoons for locally hosted kiddie television programs. Each episode featured Weaver in a first-person plural adventure (e.g., "Today we are a movie actor"), portraying himself and, behind false mustaches and costume hats, all the other characters in slapstick comedy situations with a voice over narration and minimal sets. The ending credits would invariably list "Doodles... Doodles Weaver" and "Everybody Else... Doodles Weaver."

He portrayed eccentric characters in guest appearances on such television series as Batman (where he played The Archer's henchman Crier Tuck), Land of the Giants, Dragnet 1967 and The Monkees. He appeared in more than 90 films, including The Great Imposter (1961), Alfred Hitchcock's The Birds (1963) (as the man helping Tippi Hedren's character with her rental boat), Jerry Lewis's The Nutty Professor (1963), Pocketful of Miracles (1961) and, in a cameo, It's a Mad, Mad, Mad, Mad World (1963). He appeared in Six Pack Annie (1975). His last movie was Earthbound (1981).

Personal life
Weaver was married four times and had three children. His first marriage was to Beverly Masterman in 1939. They had one child and later divorced. His second marriage, from 1946 to 1949, was to Evelyn Irene Paulsen. In 1949, Weaver's third marriage was with nightclub dancer Lois Frisell, who had the marriage annulled in 1954.

Weaver's fourth and final marriage was to actress Reita Anne Green in October 1957. They had two children before divorcing in 1969.

Death
On January 17, 1983, Weaver died of two self-inflicted gunshot wounds to the chest. His death was ruled a suicide. Weaver's son later said that his father had been despondent over his failing health. His funeral service was held on January 22 at Forest Lawn Mortuary in the Hollywood Hills. He was buried in Avalon Cemetery on Santa Catalina Island, California.

Weaver's memoir, Golden Spike, remains unpublished.

Filmography

In popular culture
 Weaver's horse race routine has been quoted and parodied by many performers over the years.
 A children's board game called Homestretch featured horses named Cabbage, Banana, Girdle, and the misspelled/simplified "Beetle Bohm." This was a direct lift of Weaver's number, with Cabbage "leading by a head" and Beetle Bohm eventually winning the race.
 Mike Kazaleh's comic The Adventures of Captain Jack took place on the planet Pootwattle and featured a character who used many of Weaver's jokes and catchphrases, such as "That's a killer!"
 A one-page Weaver contribution to Mad'' magazine #25, September 1955, had him as Professor Feetlebaum grading student Abraham Lincoln's Gettysburg Address, complete with grammatical corrections and encouraging note despite the C minus.

References

External links

 
 
 

1911 births
1983 suicides
20th-century American male actors
Male actors from Los Angeles
American male comedians
American male film actors
American male radio actors
American male television actors
American male voice actors
American people of English descent
American people of Scottish descent
Television personalities from Los Angeles
American comics writers
Multiple gunshot suicides
Los Angeles High School alumni
Musicians from Los Angeles
Parody musicians
American parodists
Stanford University alumni
Suicides by firearm in California
Comedians from California
20th-century American comedians